Calymmaria is a genus of North American araneomorph spiders in the family Cybaeidae, and was first described by R. V. Chamberlin & Wilton Ivie in 1937.

Species
 it contains thirty-one species:
Calymmaria alleni Heiss & Draney, 2004 – USA
Calymmaria aspenola Chamberlin & Ivie, 1942 – USA
Calymmaria bifurcata Heiss & Draney, 2004 – USA
Calymmaria californica (Banks, 1896) – USA
Calymmaria carmel Heiss & Draney, 2004 – USA
Calymmaria emertoni (Simon, 1897) – USA, Canada
Calymmaria farallon Heiss & Draney, 2004 – USA
Calymmaria gertschi Heiss & Draney, 2004 – USA
Calymmaria humboldi Heiss & Draney, 2004 – USA
Calymmaria iviei Heiss & Draney, 2004 – USA
Calymmaria lora Chamberlin & Ivie, 1942 – USA
Calymmaria minuta Heiss & Draney, 2004 – USA
Calymmaria monicae Chamberlin & Ivie, 1937 (type) – USA
Calymmaria monterey Heiss & Draney, 2004 – USA
Calymmaria nana (Simon, 1897) – USA, Canada
Calymmaria orick Heiss & Draney, 2004 – USA
Calymmaria persica (Hentz, 1847) – USA
Calymmaria rosario Heiss & Draney, 2004 – Mexico
Calymmaria rothi Heiss & Draney, 2004 – USA
Calymmaria scotia Heiss & Draney, 2004 – USA
Calymmaria sequoia Heiss & Draney, 2004 – USA
Calymmaria shastae Chamberlin & Ivie, 1937 – USA
Calymmaria sierra Heiss & Draney, 2004 – USA
Calymmaria similaria Heiss & Draney, 2004 – USA
Calymmaria siskiyou Heiss & Draney, 2004 – USA
Calymmaria sueni Heiss & Draney, 2004 – USA
Calymmaria suprema Chamberlin & Ivie, 1937 – USA, Canada
Calymmaria tecate Heiss & Draney, 2004 – Mexico
Calymmaria tubera Heiss & Draney, 2004 – USA
Calymmaria virginica Heiss & Draney, 2004 – USA
Calymmaria yolandae Heiss & Draney, 2004 – USA

References

Araneomorphae genera
Cybaeidae
Hahniidae
Spiders of North America